Stade Alassane Djigo is a multi-use stadium in Pikine, Senegal. It is currently used mostly for football matches and serves as a home ground of AS Pikine. The stadium holds 10,000 spectators.

Sometimes AS Douanes play its matches at the stadium.

History
The only continental competition took place in the stadium for Pikine was in the 2015 season where two matches took place.

References

External links
Stadium information

Al Djigo
AS Douanes (Senegal)
AS Pikine